The Our Lady of the Poor Cathedral Also Zacatecoluca Cathedral Is the main church of the Catholic Diocese of Zacatecoluca, in the city of Zacatecoluca, in the Central American country of El Salvador.

When the Spanish founded the city, in the sixteenth century, it was located to the east of the central square (present Cañas Square), site in which it has been located since. The Cathedral of Zacatecoluca has undergone different modifications over time.

Originally it was a hermitage of adobe and tile, maintaining itself until being replaced in 1740 by another one of facade of wood with influences of some elements of the Renaissance and Baroque styles.

This old cathedral was standing until 1965 and was called Santa Lucia Church.

In 1965 begins to be constructed the current building of the Cathedral of Zacatecoluca that was finalized in 1975 due to arrears by lack of funds for its construction.

See also
Roman Catholicism in El Salvador
Our Lady of the Poor

References

Roman Catholic cathedrals in El Salvador
Roman Catholic churches completed in 1975
20th-century Roman Catholic church buildings